Uptown is an album by the American R&B group the Neville Brothers, released in 1987. The album's title is an homage to the New Orleans neighborhood in which the Nevilles grew up. The group supported the album by touring with Santana.

The album peaked at No. 155 on the Billboard 200.

Production
After four commercially unsuccessful albums, the Nevilles brought in outside writers, producers, and musicians, including Jerry Garcia, Branford Marsalis, and Clive Langer. The album was overseen by Jim Gaines, then best known as Huey Lewis's producer, who agreed to executive produce only if he was allowed to make a "non-traditional" New Orleans album. Uptown was recorded in Metairie, Louisiana.

"Midnight Key" was cowritten by Jimmy Buffett.

Critical reception

Spin wrote: "By stripping them of all but the most subtle New Orleansisms, the Nevilles sound like Journey. Or Rick Springfield. Or instant mashed potatoes." Robert Christgau thought that "between adult themes, solidly insinuating tunes, uncommonly grizzled vocals, and faint indigenous lilt, what we have here is a pretty damn good [Contemporary Hit Radio] album."

The Globe and Mail considered that "the long-term pleasures come from Art Neville's rock steady keyboards and growling voice." USA Today thought that "the undistinquished playing offers little of the funky fire that has made the Nevilles New Orleans' top rhythm band." The Star Tribune opined that "at best, this slick production evokes vintage Tower of Power with a Southern accent; at worst, it's as bland as the made-for-radio barroom-rock 'n' soul of Huey Lewis."

AllMusic wrote that the album contains the group's "usual tight playing and exuberant collective vocals." The Rolling Stone Album Guide panned the use of "sequencers and electronic percussion."

Track listing

References

The Neville Brothers albums
1987 albums
EMI America Records albums